Proverbs 12 is the twelfth chapter of the Book of Proverbs in the Hebrew Bible or the Old Testament of the Christian Bible. The book is a compilation of several wisdom literature collections, with the heading in 1:1 may be intended to regard Solomon as the traditional author of the whole book, but the dates of the individual collections are difficult to determine, and the book probably obtained its final shape in the post-exilic period. This chapter is a part of the second collection of the book.

Text
The original text is written in Hebrew language. This chapter is divided into 28 verses.

Textual witnesses
Some early manuscripts containing the text of this chapter in Hebrew are of the Masoretic Text, which includes the Aleppo Codex (10th century), and Codex Leningradensis (1008).

There is also a translation into Koine Greek known as the Septuagint, made in the last few centuries BC. Extant ancient manuscripts of the Septuagint version include Codex Vaticanus (B; B; 4th century), Codex Sinaiticus (S; BHK: S; 4th century), and Codex Alexandrinus (A; A; 5th century).

Analysis
This chapter belongs to a section regarded as the second collection in the book of Proverbs (comprising Proverbs 10:1–22:16), also called "The First 'Solomonic' Collection" (the second one in Proverbs 25:1–29:27). The collection contains 375 sayings, each of which consists of two parallel phrases, except for Proverbs 19:7 which consists of three parts.

Verse 1
Whoever loves discipline loves knowledge,
but he who hates reproof is stupid
This saying along with those in verses 15–16 and 23 describe central characteristics of a "fool" in the Book of Proverbs, mainly:
imperviousness to a word of advice as to a word of rebuke, by reason of one's innate stupidity and self-conceit, (verses 1, 15; cf. 18:2; 28:26).
inability to recognize sound advice and to act upon it—not least by those used to giving it (verse 26). 
lacks self-control, both of one's temper (verse 16; cf. 14:17, 29; 29:11) and one's tongue (verse 23; cf. 10:14; 15:2; 18:6-7).
eagerness to speak one's mind and offers opinions (cf. 18:2) that advertises one's folly, in contrast to the disciplined, restrained speech of the wise ('conceals knowledge') (cf. 10:19; 17:28).

Verse 28
In the path of righteousness is life,
and in its pathway there is no death.
Repointing the first word as a Qal participle (דֹּרֵך, dorekh) would give a meaning “treading a path [that leads to…].”
NAB, NCV). The Greek Septuagint version reads the whole second clause as “the ways of the revengeful [lead] to death”.

See also

Related Bible parts: Psalm 30, Psalm 49, Proverbs 9, Proverbs 20, Proverbs 23

References

Sources

External links
 Jewish translations:
 Mishlei - Proverbs - Chapter 12 (Judaica Press) translation [with Rashi's commentary] at Chabad.org
 Christian translations:
 Online Bible at GospelHall.org (ESV, KJV, Darby, American Standard Version, Bible in Basic English)
 Book of Proverbs Chapter 12 King James Version
  Various versions

12